Agios Theodoros Skarinou (or ) is a village located in the Larnaca District of Cyprus, 6 km from the sea and 3 km from the village of Kofinou. Its population in 2011 was 663.

References

Communities in Larnaca District